Alberto Cabero Díaz (20 March 1874 – 13 October 1955) was a Chilean politician, President of the Chilean Senate and Member of Government Junta in 1932. He was a member of the Radical Party.

He was born in Santiago, the son of Telésforo Cabero del Canto and of Filomena Díaz. He completed his studies in the Instituto Nacional, and then attended the Universidad de Chile, where he became a lawyer. He started his political career as the first mayor of the city of Río Claro. He was elected a deputy for Curicó (1921–1924) and a Senator for Talca (1924–1930) and Talca, Linares and Curico (1930–1932).

At the time of the Socialist Republic of Chile in 1931, he was the President of the Senate. As such he took over as provisional vice president. He assumed on 26 July, and that same night he formed his cabinet, headed by a very reluctant Juan Esteban Montero as interior minister and Pedro Blanquier, the other key player, as Finance minister.

When the ministers arrived on the next morning, Opazo resigned by decree on Montero. His entire administration had lasted less than 24 hours. The speed he demonstrated to get rid of the power earned him the nickname of El Pasador (the relayer), that accompanied him until his death.

After his very brief administration, he was elected Senator for Curicó, Talca, Maule y Linares (1933–1937). He was Ambassador of Chile to the United States from 1939 to 1942. He died in Santiago on 13 October 1955.

See also
History of Chile
Government Junta of Chile (1932)
Socialist Republic of Chile
List of Chilean coups d'état

External links
Complete biography  
Biography  
Short biography 

1874 births
1955 deaths
People from Santiago
Chilean people of Spanish descent
Radical Party of Chile politicians
Heads of state of Chile
Chilean Ministers of Defense
Presidents of the Senate of Chile
Deputies of the XXXI Legislative Period of the National Congress of Chile
Ambassadors of Chile to the United States